Brian Schneider (born May 16, 1971) is an American football coach and former linebacker who is the special teams coordinator for the San Francisco 49ers.

Playing career 
After being a three sport athlete at Pomona High School, Schneider went on to be a linebacker from 1990 to 1993 at Colorado State. He was a three-year starter and earned first-team All-Conference honors as a senior and was an honorable mention All-American.

Coaching career

Colorado State 
Schneider began his career in coaching at his alma mater, working as a graduate assistant for three seasons. In 1997 he was given a promotion to become the team's special teams coordinator and tight ends coach, and he held both positions until after the 2002 season.

UCLA 
In February 2003, Schneider joined UCLA's coaching staff and stayed there for three years working with the linebackers and safeties in addition to his duties coaching the special teams for the Bruins.

Iowa State 
In 2006, Schneider once again coached tight ends in addition to the special teams, this time for Dan McCarney's Iowa State Cyclones.

Oakland Raiders 
Originally hired by the Air Force Academy, after a call, Schneider made the leap to the NFL. In 2007 and 2008, Schneider was the special team's coordinator for the Oakland Raiders. In both seasons, Shane Lechler was voted into the Pro Bowl and led the league in punting.

USC 
Schneider spent 2009 working under Pete Carroll as the special teams coordinator at USC.

Seattle Seahawks 
Following Carroll to the NFL, Schneider became the special teams coordinator for the Seattle Seahawks, a position he held for 11 years until he left on September 11, 2020,  for personal reasons. During his time with the Seahawks, he won his first Super Bowl title when the Seahawks defeated the Denver Broncos in Super Bowl XLVIII.

Jacksonville Jaguars 
On January 22, 2021, it was announced that Schneider would be returning to coaching as a part of Urban Meyer's staff. He was named the team's special teams coordinator. On May 22, 2021, he stepped away from the Jaguars indefinitely for personal reasons.

San Francisco 49ers 
On March 7, 2022, it was announced that Schneider would be hired as the special teams coordinator for the San Francisco 49ers.

Personal life 
Schneider and his wife, Kelli, have a daughter (Jaden) and three sons (Jace, Joby, and Joel).

References

1971 births
Living people
American football linebackers
Colorado State Rams football coaches
Colorado State Rams football players
Iowa State Cyclones football coaches
Jacksonville Jaguars coaches
Oakland Raiders coaches
Players of American football from San Diego
Players of American football from Colorado
Seattle Seahawks coaches
UCLA Bruins football coaches
USC Trojans football coaches
San Francisco 49ers coaches